Hayyim ben Judah ibn Musa was a Jewish physician, chemist, astronomer, and apologist who contended with Nicholas de Lyra. He was born in 1380 in Béjar, near Salamanca and died in 1460. His main work is Magen va-Romah (Shield and sword), in which he criticised Christianity.

References

1380 births
1460 deaths
People from Béjar
Medieval Jewish physicians of Spain
Jewish apologists
14th-century Sephardi Jews
15th-century Sephardi Jews